Brickleberry is an American adult animated sitcom created by Waco O'Guin and Roger Black for the basic cable network Comedy Central. Executive produced by O'Guin, Black, and comedian Daniel Tosh, the series follows a group of park rangers as they work through their daily lives in the fictional Brickleberry National Park.

Synopsis
The series follows a group of park rangers as they work through their daily lives in the fictional Brickleberry National Park.

Characters

Main characters
 Steve Williams (voiced by David Herman) – Steve is an overconfident, bumbling park ranger who takes himself and his job way too seriously. Even though he has been "Ranger of the Month" at Brickleberry for several years, he does not appear to display good skills or even common sense. Steve's "Ranger of the Month" title means everything to him and he will do anything to keep it. Despite his extreme lack of intelligence, he knows the Brickleberry park very well because his father was also a Brickleberry ranger, so Steve was raised in the park. He dreamed of working at Brickleberry since he was a child in order to follow in his father's footsteps. He is shown to have a man crush on Viggo Mortensen.
 Woodrow "Woody" Wayland Johnson (voiced by Tom Kenny) – Woody is a 55-year-old, abrasive ranger with a military background. In the "Crippleberry" episode, he mentions to Steve that he is technically a war criminal. He worked his way up to head ranger over his 30-year career at Brickleberry. He worked alongside Steve's father, but never searched for him when Jonah went missing. He rarely has the park's best interest in mind when struggling to boost the dwindling tourism numbers. In "2 Weeks Notice", he accidentally confesses to Malloy that when his mother died, his father forced him to dress up in her lingerie, implying that he may have been sexually abused by his father (However, in Season 3, Episode 4 "That Brother's my Father", it is revealed that Woody's mother, who also abused him physically, is very much alive, when she's kicked out of her nursing home and is forced to live with her son. She is briefly married to Denzel) It is also revealed in season 2 that Woody was a former porn star named Rex Erection. He makes a guest appearance along with the Brickleberry cast in Paradise PD, revealed to be an estranged cousin of series regular Chief Randall Crawford and that his obsession with Malloy stemmed from a stuff toy he owned as a child.
 Ethel Anderson (voiced by Kaitlin Olson in season 1, Natasha Leggero in season 2 and 3) – Ethel is an attractive, 25-year-old female ranger. She was the top ranger at Yellowstone and was transferred to Brickleberry in an effort to get the park back on track (and because she was fired from Yellowstone for being drunk on the job). She is quite passionate for nature, though ironically not for animals themselves. She does her best to treat her co-workers kindly although often fails due to her selfishness and occasional sociopathic behavior. Steve sees Ethel as a threat to his Ranger of the Month title whilst having a crush on her, while Ethel sees Steve as a bumbling idiot. Ethel possesses extraordinary ranger skills but is much more humble than Steve. Ethel is also notorious for her promiscuity.
 Denzel Jackson (voiced by Jerry Minor) – Denzel is a black ranger who is horrible at his job, but can't be fired because he works for a government agency. Denzel is a gerontophile, which occasionally gets him into hot water. Denzel finds his job challenging because he's afraid of bugs, snakes, and pretty much anything else that inhabits the woods. It was revealed in the first season that his father and father's father and grandfather's father were undercover cops, but Denzel has no interest in following in their footsteps. For the rest of the series, it is not mentioned again.
 Connie Cunaman (voiced by Roger Black) – Connie is a lesbian female ranger who has a large body, immense strength, and a deep voice that is often mistaken for a male. In "Gay Bomb", Connie admits she is a lesbian and it is revealed to the viewers that her strength is dubbed by her as "lesbian strength". Connie is capable of lifting massive objects, such as trees, bears, and even a real bomb. She is obsessed with Ethel and was turned away by her Evangelical parents for being a homosexual. On a side note, when Connie gets excited, her vagina makes growling noises similar to that of a stomach, requiring her to talk it down like a wild animal. The show's creators confirmed the assessment of her as a lesbian in an interview.
 Malloy (voiced by Daniel Tosh) – Malloy is the last surviving member of his species Ursus loquacious that Woody has taken in and spoiled after Steve accidentally ran over and shot his parents, telling him a tourist did it. Woody lets him play video games all day and eat junk food. Malloy is very crude, tactless, racist, sexist, has a superiority complex, and in some ways is a narcissist. He openly hates the rangers and in addition, he enjoys putting them down and messing with them on a daily basis, especially Steve.

Recurring characters
 Bobby Possumcods (voiced by Waco O'Guin) – Bobby is a redneck who lives in the park. He "loves" animals a bit too much and Malloy got a taste of this first hand in the season one premiere. O'Guin has been portraying the live action version of Possumcods for years in O'Guin and Black's underground comedy called "The DAMN! Show". He reappears briefly in Paradise PD where it's revealed he died after getting high off of leaded gasoline and jumping through a plate glass window. 
 Bodean (voiced by Roger Black) – Bodean is Bobby's sidekick and best friend. He is known to speak very fast and sometimes for a long time.
 Firecracker Jim (voiced by Roger Black) – A local redneck who sells illegal fireworks. He has stumps since he blew off his arms and legs a while ago, and rolls around everywhere as a result.
 Dr. Kuzniak (voiced by Tom Kenny) – Brickleberry's personal doctor. He has a strange fetish of medical malpractice. He also has some shady criminal intents such as medical waste dumping and dealings with the "Chinese Black Market".
 Jorge (voiced by David Herman) – A foreign man who owns the local strip club. He seems to be very clueless and gullible. His origin can be Hispanic or Armenian.

Production

Conception 
The series' creators, Waco O'Guin and Roger Black, met at the University of Georgia in 1999. The series' origin came from O'Guin's father-in-law, a retired park ranger who took his job very seriously. He and Black found his seriousness hilarious, and began first envisioning the show in 2003. The two began pitching Brickleberry as a live-action program after the cancellation of their sketch comedy show Stankervision on MTV2. It was adapted for animation because of budget concerns. Fox Broadcasting Company ordered a pilot episode in 2007, but passed on the series, finding it too offensive. The duo's agent at William Morris Agency connected them with comedian Daniel Tosh, then growing in popularity due to his Comedy Central series Tosh.0. Tosh had been looking for other projects outside his program and put his support behind the show, which they pitched to Comedy Central. The network wanted them to develop another pilot pitch, which they refused, taking it to Adult Swim, who were prepared to order 10 episodes of the comedy. Comedy Central then relented and purchased the show, ordering a 10-episode first season in 2011.

Writing 
In commenting on the series' humor, O'Guin felt that all targets are "fair game": "If you're clever and don't just try to shock for shock sake, you can make most anything funny." Anticipating concerns that the show would be too similar to Family Guy, the show's writing imposed a rule of fewer pop culture references, in order to differentiate the two.

Episodes

Comic
In 2016, a 4-issue comic miniseries, published by Dynamite Entertainment, was released, written by co-creators, Waco O'Guin and Roger Black and illustrated by Timothy Hopkins. The comic featured the storyline, "ArMOOgeddon", which takes place in the future, with Steve as the last remaining park ranger after an Alien Cow invasion, but, with the help of Dr. Kuzniak, he travels back in time to 2015 to kill Woody, whose actions led to the invasion and the destruction of all humanity. The Bovine Overlord though sends Bobby back in time to thwart Future Steve's plans, but Malloy teams up with Future Steve to help him kill Woody. When his plan fails, Future Steve returns to the future to rally the remaining park rangers to overthrow the Bovine Overlord.

Cancellation and crossover
On January 7, 2015, Comedy Central cancelled Brickleberry after three seasons. Paradise PD, also created by O'Guin and Black, premiered in 2018 and has been seen as the spiritual successor to Brickleberry due to the similar premise, characters and voice cast. The park rangers of Brickleberry National Park are referenced during the second season, with the second season of Paradise PD featuring "the most unnecessary crossover" between both series, where it is revealed Chief Randall Crawford and Woody are cousins.

Reception

Ratings
The series followed the Tosh.0 fall seasons on Tuesday nights. In its first season, the series averaged 1.9 total million viewers each week, doing particularly well with male demographics, ages 18–24. In its second season, the show averaged 1.6 million viewers, and was number one in all of television in its time slot with men, ages 18–24. The series' third season saw ratings fall to 1.2 million viewers per episode, while remaining strong with younger demographics.

Critical reviews
The show arrived to mixed reviews from critics.

Dylan P. Gadino of Laugh Spin called Brickleberry "fast-paced and hilarious."

Ray Rahman of Entertainment Weekly said the show "tends to rise above your average adult-animation fare."

Dennis Perkins of The A.V. Club commented that "Brickleberry hails from the 'deliberately provocative' school of comedy, where obviously offensive things are tossed out for shock value and if you don't laugh, you're a tight-ass who doesn't get the other levels to the jokes." Ross Bonaime of Paste gave the show a 0.5 out 10, writing that "Brickleberry is poorly constructed, horribly executed and groan-worthy rather than funny in any way. It's a show that's actually painful to watch, because it keeps finding new depths of tasteless jokes without any punchline that are worse than the ones that preceded them."

Many reviewers compared the show unfavorably to Family Guy and South Park. Brian Lowry of Variety lamented the show's eagerness to offend:
Yes, South Park has long since established animation is a fine place to skewer sacred cows, but Brickleberry has nothing more on its mind than seeing how far it can push the boundaries of dick and handicapped jokes. As a consequence, the premise (a second-rate national park) is purely incidental.

IGNs Jesse Schedeen felt the show did not live up to Comedy Central's past animated efforts, deeming it "a slap to the face of that legacy [... In South Park], there's always an underlying sense of humanity to offset the humor. Brickleberry lacks that." The series creators acknowledged the influence, saying: "Family Guy and South Park paved the way for us."

References

External links

 
 
 

2010s American adult animated television series
2010s American black comedy television series
2010s American LGBT-related animated television series
2010s American LGBT-related comedy television series
2010s American sitcoms
2010s American workplace comedy television series
2012 American television series debuts
2015 American television series endings
American animated sitcoms
American LGBT-related sitcoms
American adult animated comedy television series
English-language television shows
Fictional park rangers
Comedy Central animated television series
Comedy Central original programming
Animated television series about bears
Television series by 20th Century Fox Television
Television series by Fox Television Animation
Television series created by Waco O'Guin and Roger Black